The 1958 World Archery Championships was the 19th edition of the event. It was held in Brussels, Belgium on 20–23 July 1958 and was organised by World Archery Federation (FITA).

Medals summary

Recurve

Medals table

References

External links
 World Archery website
 Complete results

World Championship
World Archery
A
World Archery Championships